The Pierpont Inn is a Craftsman bungalow-style Inn in Ventura, California on a bluff overlooking the Santa Barbara Channel. Built in 1910 for motoring tourists, the complex is City of San Buenaventura Historic Landmark Number 80.

The Pierpont Inn and Spa became a member of Historic Hotels of America, the official program of the National Trust for Historic Preservation, in 2002.

History
In 1908, Josephine Pierpont bought land on a bluff overlooking the ocean in Ventura, California for development as a site for an inn. She felt the inn could serve the increasing number of automobile enthusiasts who would travel along the Pacific Coast looking for a place to rest and enjoy a home-cooked meal. She hired Sumner P. Hunt to build a Craftsman Style bungalow inn on the site. It opened in September 1910, originally as "The Wayside Inn", later changed to "The Pierpont Inn"

Josephine's son Austen Pierpont ran the Inn for the first many years, expanding it in 1925 by adding two English Tudor-style cottages surrounded by a lush, garden setting. He also developed the idea of turning the inn into a country club, but the idea never came to fruition.

The inn changed hands several times and fell into disrepair until it was rescued by Mrs. Mattie Vickers Gleichmann in 1928. After Mattie's husband, professional baseball player Gus Gleichmann, was forced to leave the sport after being injured, they decided to pursue a career in hospitality. Mattie borrowed $80,000 from her father Ashby Christian Vickers, a prominent Ventura farmer, to purchase and renovate the inn. It reopened in 1929 as a family affair, as her husband, mother, sister, brother-in-law and children all worked on and around the property.

In 1938, Gus Gleichmann was killed in an automobile accident and Mattie decided to continue operation of the Inn without him to fulfill the dream of being able to provide a future for their children. This dream became a reality when her son Ted returned from World War II and embraced the role of general manager. Ted Gleichmann brought modernization to the Inn and added an East Wing with 12 guestrooms including fireplaces in 1954. Later he added the Bluff House and West Wing to bring the total number of rooms to 72. In addition to his duties at the Inn, Ted was a championship-winning, amateur PGA golfer. Among his victories was the 1963 Bing Crosby Invitational Tournament (now known as the AT&T Pebble Beach Pro-Am). Through his success in the golf world, he attracted many of his famous social contacts to the Inn.

In the 1950s, the Ventura Freeway was built below the bluff that the Inn sits on.

In 1976, Spencer and Scott Garrett (grandchildren of Mattie Gleichmann's sister) leased the then-vacant parcel of land adjacent to the Inn to build one of the nation's first multi-purpose athletic facilities, "The Pierpont Racquet Club". After Mattie's death in 1996 at the age of 100, the Inn was eventually sold to the Garretts. In 2005 the Garretts sold the inn to Central Coast Management Inc. In 2009, Central Coast Management Inc. sold the inn to the Pierpont Group LLC, headed by investor Grace S. Ahn.

The property went into bankruptcy auction in late 2012 and the Inn transferred from the Ahn Family Trust to Brighton Management. Wyndham Garden Ventura Pierpont Inn was the new name selected when Brighton Management signed a franchise agreement with Wyndham's national reservation system in December 2013. Renovations to the rooms and grounds were needed after a period of neglect. In 2015, DKN Hotels acquired the property and stated that the renovations would continue along with remaining under the Wyndham franchise.

Notable guests

The Inn was a playground for elite society. Tinsel-town notables such as Cecil B. DeMille, Bette Davis, Edward G. Robinson and Charlie Chaplin all took breaks from filming in Hollywood by escaping to the charming location.

The property was also a hideaway for scandalous lovers such as Clark Gable & Carole Lombard and Humphrey Bogart & Lauren Bacall, many of whom, because they were married to others, desired to have their privacy protected. The Inn's remote location provided the perfect venue to escape the limelight.

Local attorney Erle Stanley Gardner authored his "Perry Mason" series in his law office down the road from the Inn and actually used it as a backdrop for many of his novels, particularly in "The Case of the Velvet Claws." George H. W. Bush along with wife Barbara (with their son George W. Bush in tow) spent considerable time at the Inn between 1949-1950 while Bush senior was apprenticing in the oil business.

See also

 City of Ventura Historic Landmarks and Districts

References

External links
City of Ventura. "City Landmarks, Points of Interest, and Historic Districts". Historic Preservation in Ventura webpage.

Hotels in California
Buildings and structures in Ventura, California
Hotels established in 1910
History of Ventura County, California
Landmarks in Ventura, California
Tourist attractions in Ventura County, California
Sumner Hunt buildings
American Craftsman architecture in California
Bungalow architecture in California
1910 establishments in California